Edward Divett (1797 – 25 July 1864) was a British Liberal and Radical politician.

Divett was elected Radical MP for Exeter at the 1832 general election and held the seat until his death in 1864.

References

External links
 

UK MPs 1832–1835
UK MPs 1835–1837
UK MPs 1837–1841
UK MPs 1841–1847
UK MPs 1847–1852
UK MPs 1852–1857
UK MPs 1857–1859
UK MPs 1859–1865
1797 births
1864 deaths
Liberal Party (UK) MPs for English constituencies
Members of the Parliament of the United Kingdom for Exeter